The Declaration of Pillnitz was a statement of five sentences issued on 27 August 1791 at Pillnitz Castle near Dresden (Saxony) by Frederick William II of Prussia and the Habsburg Holy Roman Emperor Leopold II who was Marie Antoinette's brother. It declared the joint support of the Holy Roman Empire and of Prussia for King Louis XVI of France against the French Revolution.

Background
Since the French Revolution of 1789, Leopold had become increasingly concerned about the safety of his sister, Marie Antoinette, and her family but felt that any intervention in French affairs would only increase their danger. At the same time, many French aristocrats were fleeing France and taking up residence in neighbouring countries, spreading fear of the Revolution and agitating for foreign support to Louis XVI. After Louis and his family had fled Paris in the hopes of inciting a counter-revolution, known as the Flight to Varennes in June 1791, Louis had been apprehended and was returned to Paris and kept under armed guard. On 6 July 1791, Leopold issued the Padua Circular, calling on the sovereigns of Europe to join him in demanding Louis' freedom.

Purpose
Calling on European powers to intervene if Louis was threatened, the declaration was intended to serve as a warning to the French revolutionaries to stop infringing on the king's prerogatives and to permit his resumption of power.

The declaration stated that Austria would go to war if and only if all the other major European powers also went to war with France. Leopold chose this wording so that he would not be forced to go to war; he knew the British prime minister, William Pitt, did not support war with France. Leopold issued the declaration only to satisfy the French émigrés who had taken refuge in his country and were calling for foreign interference in their homeland.

(The Pillnitz Conference itself dealt mainly with the Polish Question and the war of Austria against the Ottoman Empire.)

Text of the Declaration
"His Majesty the Emperor and His Majesty the King of Prussia (…) declare together that they regard the actual situation of His Majesty the King of France as a matter of communal interest for all sovereigns of Europe. They hope that that interest will be recognized by the powers whose assistance is called in, and that they won't refuse, together with aforementioned Majesties, the most efficacious means for enabling the French king to strengthen, in utmost liberty, the foundations of a monarchical government suiting to the rights of the sovereigns and favourable to the well-being of the French. In that case, aforementioned Majesties are determined to act promptly and unanimously, with the forces necessary for realizing the proposed and communal goal. In expectation, they will give the suitable orders to their troops so that they will be ready to commence activity."

Consequences
The National Assembly of France interpreted the declaration to mean that Austria and Prussia were threatening the revolution, which had the result of radicalising the French revolutionaries and increasing tensions. The National Assembly voted for the French annexation of the Comtat Venaissin including Avignon from the Papal States in September 1791. Austria and Prussia concluded a defensive alliance in February 1792. Radical Frenchmen who called for war, such as Jacques Pierre Brissot, used the Declaration of Pillnitz as a pretext to gain influence and declare war on 20 April 1792, leading to the campaigns of 1792 in the French Revolutionary Wars.

Notes

External links

 Pillnitzer Punktation auf EPOCHE NAPOLEON in German.
  Declaration of Pillnitz audio episode at Warsofcoalition.com

1791 events of the French Revolution
1791 in the Holy Roman Empire
1791 in Prussia
1791 documents
Leopold II, Holy Roman Emperor
Louis XVI